Barbara Schwartz and Jasmin Wöhr were the defending champions, but Schwartz did not compete this year. Wöhr teamed up with Émilie Loit and lost in semifinals to runners-up Ľubomíra Kurhajcová and Barbora Strýcová.

Emmanuelle Gagliardi and Tina Pisnik won the title by defeating Ľubomíra Kurhajcová and Barbora Strýcová 6–4, 6–3 in the final.

Seeds

Draw

Draw

References
 Official results archive (ITF)
 Official results archive (WTA)

Copa Colsanitas Seguros Bolivar - Doubles
2005 Doubles